Matty L McNair (born in Pennsylvania, United States) is an American explorer. She now lives in Iqaluit, Nunavut, Canada on Baffin Island, where she runs her company NorthWinds. Among her many accomplishments are:
 1997 leading the first ever all-female expedition to the Geographic North Pole.
 2000 she led an expedition across Ellesmere Island through the Sverdrup Pass.
 2003/04 she led two ski-all-the-way expeditions to the South Pole.
 2003 crossed the Greenland Ice Cap with her children Sarah and Eric by ski-kites with dog sled support.
 2004/2005 completed an unsupported ski expedition to the South Pole, again accompanied by her children Sarah and Eric, who became the youngest persons to ski to the South Pole.
 2007 drove a dogsled with Richard Hammond in a race to the 1996 location of the North Magnetic Pole as part of Top Gear: Polar Special. This journey was cut short before her party reached the pole because the other competitors (in trucks) reached the destination first.
 She is the first American to ski to both the North and South Poles.

References

Books
On Thin Ice: A Woman's Journey to the North Pole (1999),

External links
 NorthWinds
 National Geographic Adventurers of the Year 2005
 Best of ExplorersWeb 2005 Awards: Matty McNair - Arctic and Antarctica
 All American Speakers bio

American explorers
Living people
Year of birth missing (living people)
People from Iqaluit
American emigrants to Canada
People from Pennsylvania